"Adoro te devote" is a Eucharistic hymn written by Thomas Aquinas. It is one of the five Eucharistic hymns which were composed and set to music for the Solemnity of Corpus Christi, instituted in 1264 by Pope Urban IV as a Solemnity for the Latin Church of the Catholic Church.

Since the beginning of its composition and it being set to music, Adoro te devote was chanted as an Eucharistic Hymn during Mass in honorem SS. Sacramenti (in honour of the Most Blessed Sacrament), as it was written in the Latin manuscripts. So it was also chanted for the Eucharistic adoration.

The authorship of the hymn by Thomas Aquinas was previously doubted by some scholars. More recent scholarship has put such doubts to rest. Thomas seems to have used it also as a private prayer, for a daily adoration of the Blessed Sacrament.

Adoro te devote is one of the medieval poetic compositions, being used as spoken prayers and also as chanted hymns, which were preserved in the Roman Missal published in 1570 following the Council of Trent (1545–1563).

The hymn is still sung today, though its use is optional in the post-Vatican II ordinary form.

Text and literal translation

There are two variant readings of the Latin text, with slightly different nuances to some of the words:
"most of the variations occur in the first two verses. The substitution of the words "posset omni scélere" in place of "quit ab omni scélere" in the second-to-last verse and "cupio" for "sitio" in the closing one are practically the only other changes". This does not affect the overall meaning of the lines or stanzas so that "either variant may be legitimately used according to local custom."

Poetic English translations
There have been at least 16 significant English translations of Adoro te devote, reflecting its popularity as a prayer and hymn, including versions by Edward Bouverie Pusey, Edward Caswall, and Gerard Manley Hopkins. There are also several popular hymns such as "Humbly We Adore Thee," which employ the 13th century Benedictine plainsong melody, but use modern texts not related to the Latin text.

Liturgical use 
This hymn was added to the Roman Missal in 1570 by Pope Pius V, and also it has more quotations in the Catechism of the Catholic Church (n. 1381). This Eucharistic hymn was generally chanted with a genuflection in front of the Blessed Sacrament.

The hymn is typically used as an Eucharistic hymn and is sung either during the distribution of communion at Mass, or during the Benediction of the Blessed Sacrament.

Final prayer 
Until the first half of the nineteenth century, the (Eucharistic) chant Adoro te devote was often used to be followed by this second Thanksgiving prayer, referred to Jesus Christ God:

Obsecro Te, sancte Domine Jesu
Christe, ut passio tua sit mihi virtus
qua muniar atque defendar,
vulnera tua sit mihi cibus potusque
quibus pascar, inebrier atque delecter;
aspersio sanguinis tui sit mihi ablutio
omnium delictorum meorum;
resurrectio tua sit mihi gloria
sempiterna. In his sit mihi refectio,
exultatio sanitas et dulcedo
cordis mei. Qui vivis et regnas in
unitate Patri et Spiritus Sancti Deus
per omnia saecula saeculorum.
Amen.

On 13 December 1849, Pope Pius IX stated a period of some days of indulgence in favour of any Christian people having declaimed this prayer.

See also 
 Veni Creator Spiritus
 Lauda Sion 
 Pange Lingua
 Sacris solemniis 
 Verbum supernum prodiens

Notes

References

External links

 
 "Humbly We Adore Thee

Latin-language Christian hymns
Eucharist in the Catholic Church
13th-century poems
13th-century Latin literature
Hymns by Thomas Aquinas
Thomas Aquinas
Italian Christian hymns